Glassnote Records (also known as Glassnote Entertainment Group LLC) is a record label that was launched by American music executive Daniel Glass in 2007. The label primarily has a lineup of indie rock and alternative rock artists, most notably Mumford & Sons and Phoenix. The label has also released music from popular artists in other genres, such as Chvrches, Childish Gambino and Secondhand Serenade. The label is distributed by The Orchard as of 2022.

History
In 2009, the label released French indie rock band Phoenix's fourth album, Wolfgang Amadeus Phoenix, which was awarded the Grammy Award for Best Alternative Music Album in 2010.

In February 2011, Mumford & Sons' Sigh No More became the label's highest charting album, peaking at #2. That same month, Mumford & Sons' single "The Cave" became the label's second Top 40 chart placement on the Billboard Hot 100, peaking at #27 (the first being "Fall for You" by Secondhand Serenade in 2008). The September 2012 release of the band's second album, Babel, gave the label its first ever #1 album on the Billboard 200 and the label's first album to win the Grammy Award for Album of the Year.

Childish Gambino, the music project of actor and comedian Donald Glover, signed with Glassnote Records in September 2011. Shortly after on November 15, 2011, the label released its first hip hop album, Camp. On December 10, 2013, the label released his second studio album Because the Internet. On February 13, 2014, it was revealed that Glassnote had signed a global distribution agreement with Universal Music Group, excluding Australia/New Zealand (Liberator), and South Africa (Just Music). The label was previously distributed by RED Distribution in the US. In October 2017, Glassnote Entertainment Group's resolved records partnered with Spacebomb Group to provide financial, marketing and industry expertise to the owners of the company.

The name "Glassnote" is a play on the glasnot political reforms of Soviet leader Mikhail Gorbachev.

Awards
In the April 28, 2011 issue of Rolling Stone, Glassnote was named Best Indie Label.

Two albums released by the label have been certified platinum by the Recording Industry Association of America for sales of at least one million units: Sigh No More and Babel, both by Mumford & Sons. Sigh No More, which has been certified triple-platinum for sales of three million copies, is the label's highest selling record.

Four other albums have been certified gold for sales of 500,000 units: Wolfgang Amadeus Phoenix by Phoenix, Wilder Mind by Mumford & Sons and Because the Internet and "Awaken, My Love!", both by Childish Gambino.

Current roster

 AURORA
 Baio
 Daughter
 Dylan Cartlidge
 Flight Facilities
 Givers
 Half Moon Run
 Hamilton Leithauser
 Holychild
 Ider
 Jade Bird
 James Hersey
 Jeremy Messersmith
 Júníus Meyvant
 Justin Nozuka
 Lawrence Taylor
 LUWTEN
 Mansionair
 Mosa Wild
 Mumford & Sons
 Phoenix
 Robert DeLong
 Ripe
 Secondhand Serenade
 Silvana Estrada
 The Strumbellas
 The Temper Trap
 The Teskey Brothers
 Two Door Cinema Club 
 William Prince

Former artists

 Blowing Trees
 CHVRCHES
 Childish Gambino
 Everlea
 Flo Morrissey
 Foy Vance
 Hamilton Leithauser + Rostam
 HUNTAR
 I Hate Kate
 Jonas Sees in Color
 Kele
 Little Green Cars
 Madisen Ward and the Mama Bear
 Oberhofer
 Panama Wedding
 Royal Bangs
 Shibashi
 Son Lux
 snny
 Tor Miller

Catalog
 Everlea – Everlea (May 11, 2007)
 Secondhand Serenade – Awake (May 22, 2007)
 Blowing Trees – Blowing Trees (March 18, 2008)
 Justin Nozuka – Holly (April 15, 2008)
 I Hate Kate – Embrace the Curse (June 24, 2008)
 Secondhand Serenade – A Twist in My Story (February 18, 2009)
 Phoenix – Wolfgang Amadeus Phoenix (May 26, 2009)
 Jonas Sees in Color – Jonas Sees in Color (September 29, 2009)
 Mumford & Sons – Sigh No More (October 6, 2009)
 The Temper Trap – Conditions (October 13, 2009)
 Justin Nozuka – You I Wind Land and Sea (April 13, 2010)
 Two Door Cinema Club – Tourist History (April 27, 2010)
 Kele – The Boxer (June 21, 2010)
 Secondhand Serenade – Hear Me Now (August 2010)
 Royal Bangs – Flux Outside (March 29, 2011)
 Secondhand Serenade – Weightless EP (May 2011)
 Givers – In Light (June 7, 2011)
 Childish Gambino – Camp (November 15, 2011)
 Oberhofer – Time Capsules II (March 2012)
 Half Moon Run – Dark Eyes (March 27, 2012)
 The Temper Trap – The Temper Trap (May 18, 2012)
 Two Door Cinema Club – Beacon (September 4, 2012)
 Mumford & Sons – Babel (September 21, 2012)
 Robert DeLong – Global Concepts EP (October 30, 2012)
 Robert DeLong – Just Movement (February 5, 2013)
 Chvrches – Recover EP (March 25, 2013)
 Little Green Cars – Absolute Zero (March 26, 2013)
 Phoenix – Bankrupt! (April 22, 2013)
 Brian Tyler and various artists – Now You See Me Original Motion Picture Soundtrack (May 28, 2013)
 Foy Vance – Joy Of Nothing (August 26, 2013)
 Chvrches – The Bones of What You Believe (September 20, 2013)
 Childish Gambino – Because the Internet  (December 10, 2013)
 Panama Wedding – Parallel Play EP (June 3, 2014)
 Childish Gambino – Kauai (October 3, 2014)
 Flight Facilities – Down to Earth (October 24, 2014)
 Robert DeLong – Long Way Down EP (November 10, 2014)
 Tor Miller – Headlights EP (February 2, 2015)
 Mumford & Sons – Wilder Mind (May 4, 2015)
 Holychild – The Shape of Brat Pop to Come (June 2, 2015)
 Madisen Ward and the Mama Bear – Skeleton Crew (June 14, 2015)
 Robert DeLong – In The Cards (September 18, 2015)
 Baio – The Names (September 18, 2015)
 Chvrches – Every Open Eye (September 25, 2015)
 Oberhofer – Chronovision (October 9, 2015)
 Panama Wedding – Into Focus (November 6, 2015)
 Daughter – Not to Disappear (January 15, 2016)
 Little Green Cars – Ephemera (March 11, 2016)
 AURORA – All My Demons Greeting Me as a Friend (March 11, 2016)
 The Strumbellas – Hope (April 22, 2016)
 Hamilton Leithauser + Rostam – I Had a Dream That You Were Mine (September 23, 2016)
 Tor Miller – American English (September 30, 2016)
 Two Door Cinema Club – Gameshow (October 14, 2016)
 Childish Gambino – "Awaken, My Love!" (December 2, 2016)
 Flo Morrissey and Matthew E. White – Gentlewoman, Ruby Man (January 13, 2017)
 Jeremy Messersmith – 11 Obscenely Optimistic Songs For Ukulele: A Micro Folk Record For the 21st Century and Beyond (April 14, 2017)
 Phoenix – Ti Amo (June 9, 2017)
 Jade Bird – Something American (July 7, 2017)
 Various Artists  – Noteworthy 01 (July 28, 2017)
 snny  – Learning to Swim (September 8, 2017)
 HUNTAR  – Your Favourite Worse Mistake (September 15, 2017)
 Justin Nozuka  – High Tide EP (September 22, 2017)
 Baio – Grooves of the World (November 3, 2017)
 Justin Nozuka  – Low Tide EP (February 16, 2018)
 Jeremy Messersmith  – Late Stge Capitalism (March 9, 2018)
 Justin Nozuka  – Run to Waters (May 18, 2018)
 Two Door Cinema Club  – Four Words to Stand By (March 23, 2018)
 Chvrches  – Love is Dead (May 25, 2018)
 Madisen Ward and The Mama Bear  – The Radio Winners (July 27, 2018)
 GIVERS  – Movin On EP (August 3, 2018)
 AURORA  – Infections of a Different Kind (Step I) (September 28, 2018)
 The Teskey Brothers  – Half Mile Harvest (October 26, 2018)
 Mumford & Sons  – Delta (November 16, 2018)
 HUNTAR  – The Ride (December 7, 2018)
 Ider  – Emotional Education (July 19, 2019)
 Hamilton Leithauser  – The Loves of Your Life (April 10, 2020)
 Baio  – Dead Hand Control (January 29, 2021)
 Jade Bird  – Different Kinds of Light (August 13, 2021)
 Chvrches  – Screen Violence (August 27, 2021)
 Silvana Estrada  – Marchita (January 21, 2022)
 Two Door Cinema Club  – Keep On Smiling (September 2, 2022)
 Phoenix - Alpha Zulu (November 4, 2022)

See also
 List of record labels

References

External links

 

American independent record labels
Record labels established in 2007
Alternative rock record labels
Indie rock record labels
2007 establishments in New York City